Weimar Independent School District is a public school district based in Weimar, Texas (USA).

Located in Colorado County, the district extends into small portions of Fayette and Lavaca counties. The district serves the unincorporated area of Borden since 1948, when the Borden area schools were consolidated into the Weimar district.

In 2009, the school district was rated "academically acceptable" by the Texas Education Agency.

Schools
Weimar High School (Grades 9-12)
Weimar Junior High School (Grades 5-8)
Weimar Elementary School (Grades PK-4)

References

External links
 

School districts in Colorado County, Texas
School districts in Fayette County, Texas
School districts in Lavaca County, Texas